Yin is a Chinese surname. In 800 BCE, Bo Jifu, a renowned judge during the reign of King Xuan of Zhou, held the position of Yin (equivalent to First Minister or most favored Minister) and changed his name to Yin Jifu. During the era of the Imperial Examination System, three other magistrates took on the surname Yǐn to denote their Imperial rank and favoured status. It is the 100th name on the Hundred Family Surnames poem.

The Korean surname Yoon and the Vietnamese surname Doãn are derived from Yin and traditionally written in the same Chinese character.

A 2013 study found it to be the 79th most common surname, being shared by 3,460,000 people or 0.260% of the population, with the province with the most being Hunan.

Notable people 
 Yiin Chii-ming (born 1952) Minister of Economic Affairs of the Republic of China (2008–2009)
 Yin Fu, creator of a sub-branch of the Bagua martial art; bodyguard to the Empress Dowager Cixi and personal trainer of the Emperor.
 Yin Han and Yin Zhen, members of the judiciary of the Han Dynasty.
 Yin Lin, a painter of the Tang Dynasty.
 Yin Zhongke, a member of the judiciary of the Song Dynasty.
 Yin Zhangsheng, a painter of the Song Dynasty,
 Yin Wen, a personal tutor of princes of the Ming Dynasty
 Wan Kwong (born 1949 in Saigon, Vietnam), Hong Kong pop singer, born Lui Minkwong (呂明光 and also known as Jackson Wan Kwong), a singer from Hong Kong, known as "The Temple Street Prince"
 Yin Li (politician), Governor of Sichuan (2016–)
 Wan Kuok-koi (born 1955), popularly known as Broken Tooth Koi, former leader of the Macau branch of the 14K Triad
 Yin Zheng (born 1986), Chinese actor
 Terence Yin Chi-wai (born 1975), a Chinese film actor
 Samuel Yin (born 1950) Taiwanese billionaire businessman and philanthropist
 Xi Yin (born 1983) a Chinese-American theoretical physicist
 Yin Mingshan (born 1938 in Chongqing, Sichuan) a Chinese businessman, the chairman of Lifan Industrial Corporation
 Nattawat Finkler Patrick Yin (born 2003) Thai-German Actor, member of Chinese Boygroup INTO1

References

Chinese-language surnames
Individual Chinese surnames